Chicago IX: Chicago's Greatest Hits is the first greatest hits album, and ninth album overall, by the American band Chicago and was released in 1975 by Columbia Records in both stereo (PC 33900) and SQ quadraphonic (PCQ 33900) versions.

Including all of Chicago's biggest hits to date, this set stretches from their 1969 debut, Chicago Transit Authority, to 1974's Chicago VII. Chicago VIII and its hits, having only come out just months earlier, were considered too recent to anthologize, while Chicago III'''s material was overlooked for inclusion due to its lack of top-selling singles.Chicago IX proved to be an enormous success upon its release. It reached No. 1 in the US and remained on the Billboard 200 for a total of 72 weeks. It has since been certified quintuple platinum by the RIAA, signifying sales of over five million copies. Chicago IX was reissued by Rhino Records, Chicago's current distributor. The album did not chart in the UK.

Track listing

Side one
"25 or 6 to 4" (Robert Lamm) – 4:51
"Does Anybody Really Know What Time It Is?" (Lamm) – 3:20 CD 2:53 LP/Cassette
 On the original LP (and cassette) version of Chicago IX, most of the intro was cut off. The spoken part over the last verse was also omitted."Colour My World" (James Pankow) – 2:59
"Just You 'n' Me" (Pankow) – 3:42
"Saturday in the Park" (Lamm) – 3:54
"Feelin' Stronger Every Day" (Peter Cetera/Pankow) – 4:14

Side two
"Make Me Smile" (Pankow) – 2:59
 This is the single edit that also includes parts of "Now More Than Ever"."Wishing You Were Here" (Cetera) – 4:34
"Call on Me" (Lee Loughnane) – 4:02
"(I've Been) Searchin' So Long" (Pankow) – 4:29
"Beginnings" (Lamm) – 7:51 CD 6:28 LP/Cassette
 On the original LP version, this song fades out about 1:20 early.''

The UK version contains the additions of "Never Been in Love Before" and a shortened 3:27 version of "I'm a Man". The Brazilian version has the addition of "Happy Man" and moves "25 or 6 to 4" to the end of Side 1. "Feelin' Stronger Every Day" and "(I've Been) Searchin' So Long" are omitted.

Personnel
Peter Cetera – bass, guitar, lead & background vocals
Terry Kath – guitars, lead & background vocals
Robert Lamm – keyboards, lead & background vocals
Lee Loughnane – trumpet, flugelhorn, percussion, background vocals
James Pankow – trombone, percussion, background vocals
Walter Parazaider – woodwinds, percussion, background vocals
Danny Seraphine – drums, percussion
Laudir de Oliveira – percussion 
James William Guercio – producer
John Berg – design
Nick Fasciano – logo
Reid Miles – photography

Charts

Weekly charts

Year-end charts

References

1975 greatest hits albums
Albums produced by James William Guercio
Chicago (band) compilation albums
Columbia Records compilation albums
Albums with cover art by Reid Miles